Nangal Salempur is a village in Jalandhar - I in Jalandhar district of Punjab State, India. The village is administrated by Sarpanch an elected representative of the village.

Demography 
, The village has a total number of 189 houses and a population of 891, of which 460 are males while 431 are females.  According to the report published by Census India in 2011, out of the total population of the village, 502 people are from Schedule Caste and the village does not have any Schedule Tribe population so far.

See also
List of villages in India

References

External links 
 Tourism of Punjab
 Census of Punjab

Villages in Jalandhar district